
Konin County is a unit of territorial administration and local government (powiat) in Greater Poland Voivodeship, west-central Poland. It came into being on January 1, 1999, as a result of the Polish local government reforms passed in 1998. Its administrative seat is the city of Konin, although the city is not part of the county (it constitutes a separate city county).

As of 2006 its total population is 123,646, out of which the population of Golina is 4,330, that of Kleczew is 4,173, that of Sompolno is 3,695, that of Ślesin is 3,102, that of Rychwał is 2,377, and the rural population is 105,969.

Neighbouring counties
Apart from the city of Konin, Konin County is also bordered by Mogilno County, Inowrocław County and Radziejów County to the north, Koło County to the east, Turek County to the south-east, Kalisz County to the south, Pleszew County to the south-west, and Słupca County to the west.

Administrative division
The county is subdivided into 14 gminas (five urban-rural and nine rural). These are listed in the following table, in descending order of population.

References
Polish official population figures 2006

External links

Official county website
Town website of Old City - www.konin-starowka.pl

 
Konin